Southern Force is an Australian netball team that represents Netball South Australia in the Australian Netball League. In 2008 they were founder members of the ANL. Between 2008 and 2011 they played as South Australia. As Southern Force they were ANL champions in 2012 and were grand  finalists in 2015. Southern Force are effectively the representative team of the Netball South Australia Premier League and the reserve team of Adelaide Thunderbirds.

History

Netball South Australia
Southern Force are effectively the representative team of the Netball South Australia Premier League.  They are one of two teams that represent Netball South Australia in senior or national leagues. Their senior team, Adelaide Thunderbirds, has represented Netball South Australia in both the ANZ Championship and Suncorp Super Netball. Southern Force are effectively the reserve team of Thunderbirds. Between 2008 and 2011, Netball South Australia's ANL team simply played as South Australia. In 2012 they became Southern Force, a name that was first suggested by members of the 2011 ANL squad.

ANL/ANC Grand finals
In 2012 with a squad that included Kelly Altmann, Georgia Beaton, Cody Lange, Maddy Proud, Melissa Rowland, Kate Shimmin and Sheree Wingard, Southern Force finished as ANL Champions, defeating NNSW Waratahs 50–36 in the grand final. In 2015, with a squad that saw Lange, Shimmin and Wingard joined by Sarah Klau, Hannah Petty, Samantha Poolman and Maddy Turner, Southern Force reached the grand final for a second time. However on this occasion they lost 58–46 to Victorian Fury.

Home venue
Southern Force play their home games at the Netball SA Stadium. They have also played home games at the Titanium Security Arena.

Notable players

2022 squad

Internationals

 Kate Shimmin

 Samantha Poolman
 Lucy Austin
 Gerogie Horjus

 Beth Cobden
 Kate Shimmin

 Cathrine Tuivaiti

 Cathrine Tuivaiti

New South Wales Swifts
 Maddy Turner
 Maddy Proud
 Sarah Klau

Adelaide Thunderbirds 

Lucy Austin
 Georgie Horjus
 Hannah Petty
 Kate Shimmin

Sunshine Coast Lightning 

 Kate Shimmin

ANL MVP
The following Southern Force players were named MVP in the Australian Netball League.

Head coaches

Premierships
Australian Netball League
Winners: 2012: 1
Runners up: 2015: 1

References

 
Netball teams in Australia
Adelaide Thunderbirds
Australian Netball League teams
Netball teams in South Australia
Netball
Sports clubs established in 2008
2008 establishments in Australia
Australian Netball Championship teams